A Month by the Sea: Encounters in Gaza is a book by Irish author Dervla Murphy. It was first published by Eland Books in 2013.

Summary
A Month by the Sea describes Murphy's stay in Palestine during Operation Cast Lead. She met liberals and Islamists, Hamas and Fatah supporters. A second book followed – Between River and Sea – but she destroyed the material for a third book based on visits to the Palestinian refugee camps in Jordan for fear that it might endanger their lives.

References

External links
 

2013 non-fiction books
Eland Books books
Books by Dervla Murphy